Climate Change TV is the world’s first online broadcaster dedicated entirely to climate change issues.  It contains interviews from heads of state, government officials and negotiators, NGO's, Civil Society and business professionals with a range of views on the climate change negotiations.

It is hosted by Responding to Climate Change, an NGO and Official Observer to the United Nations Framework Convention on Climate Change (UNFCCC).

RTCC provides a daily news and analysis service following latest developments in climate policy, research and other aspects of the climate debate. In February this year they submitted a series of proposals to the UNFCCC on raising the ambition of the Durban Platform, which had been agreed at COP17.

The Studio is run for the UNFCCC at the annual COP. The interviews are hosted on RTCC and the UNFCCC's studio portal.

It provides for one-on-one video interviews with a wide array of stakeholders from civil society, intergovernmental organizations and party delegates. The studio provides a platform for discussing the effects of climate change, causes of global warming and possible solutions. It continues at COP17/CMP 7 after successfully running at COP15/CMP 5 in Copenhagen, and COP16/CMP 6 in Cancun.

At the most recent COP, held in December 2011, the Climate Change TV Studio was visited by UNFCCC Chief Executive Christiana Figueres, lead Netherlands negotiator Maas Goote, and UK Minister for energy and climate change Greg Barker, along with members of Oxfam and 350.org.

References

External links 
 
 UNFCCC 
 RTCC

Climate change organizations